The Fairford Five was a group of five British peace protesters who broke into the RAF Fairford military air base in 2003 and disabled equipment in order to disrupt military operations at the start of the Iraq War. The group was given its name by supporters and by articles in the press reporting on the event and the judicial trials which followed. Two members of the group had previously been members of Trident Ploughshares.  The case which followed resulted in the first occurrence of a High Court Judge being called upon to pronounce on the legality of a war.

On the night of 13 March 2003 the first two protesters breached the perimeter fence of the RAF Fairford base using bolt-cutters, and once inside attacked instrument panels, brake cables and windscreens of support vehicles which were needed to supply the B-52 bombers due to fly that day. They used hammers and are also reported to have been carrying grinding-paste to put into fuel tanks. In their commitment to peaceful protest, the two protesters left notices on the damaged vehicles to warn operators and prevent an accident. They were discovered by a US serviceman, did not resist arrest, and were taken to Stroud police station. Their actions delayed the planned missions and caused £10,000 worth of damage. On the night of 20 March 2003 the other three protesters broke into the base and were arrested at the perimeter fence. Bombers did not fly from Fairford to bomb Baghdad until 16 March.

Trial 

All five were charged with criminal damage and taken to trial. After some preliminary meetings, their case was heard in Bristol Crown Court by Justice Grigson, with the defence resting on the claim that the war was illegal, making their actions a justifiable attempt to prevent war crimes. The case put pressure on the attorney general Lord Goldsmith to reveal the advice he had given to the government in the lead up to the war.

A guilty verdict was reached at the court in Bristol, but through an appeal to the Royal Court of Justice the defendants were able to obtain a hearing at the British High Court. This caused enough concern at the Foreign Office to lead under-secretary of state Sir Michael Hastings to warn "it would be prejudicial to the national interest and to the conduct of the Government’s foreign policy if the English courts were to express opinions on questions of international law", in a four-page statement which was passed to the court minutes before the hearing was due to start. The appeal was eventually heard alongside two other similar cases, and was sustained, leading to a number of retrials.

Convictions 

Three of the defendants were acquitted, one received a conditional discharge and a £250 fine for costs, with the final defendant receiving a curfew order on 2 August 2007 which lasted until the following January.

References 

British anti-war activists
Direct action
Fairford